Greg Athans (18 June 1955–8 August 2006) was a Canadian freestyle skier competing from 1976 to 1986 winning titles in multiple disciplines. Athans was also Canadian national waterskiing champion on fifteen occasions. He competed in the Canada Games, winning gold medals in the alpine slalom in 1971, and water skiing in 1973, becoming the first athlete to win gold medals at both the summer and winter games. In 1981, he was the best all-round competitor at the 1980 FIS Freestyle Ski World Cup, winning the World Cup Grand Prix Award. He retired in 1982.

Athans published a book, Ski Free, detailing step-by-step instructions on how to perform freestyle moves.

Athans died as a result of complications from diabetes. He was inducted posthumously into the British Columbia Sports Hall of Fame in 2014.

Results

FIS World Cup podiums

Works

References

External links
 

1955 births
2006 deaths